= Blessing Akporode Clark =

Nigerian diplomat (1930–2022)

His Excellency Blessing Akporode Clark CON
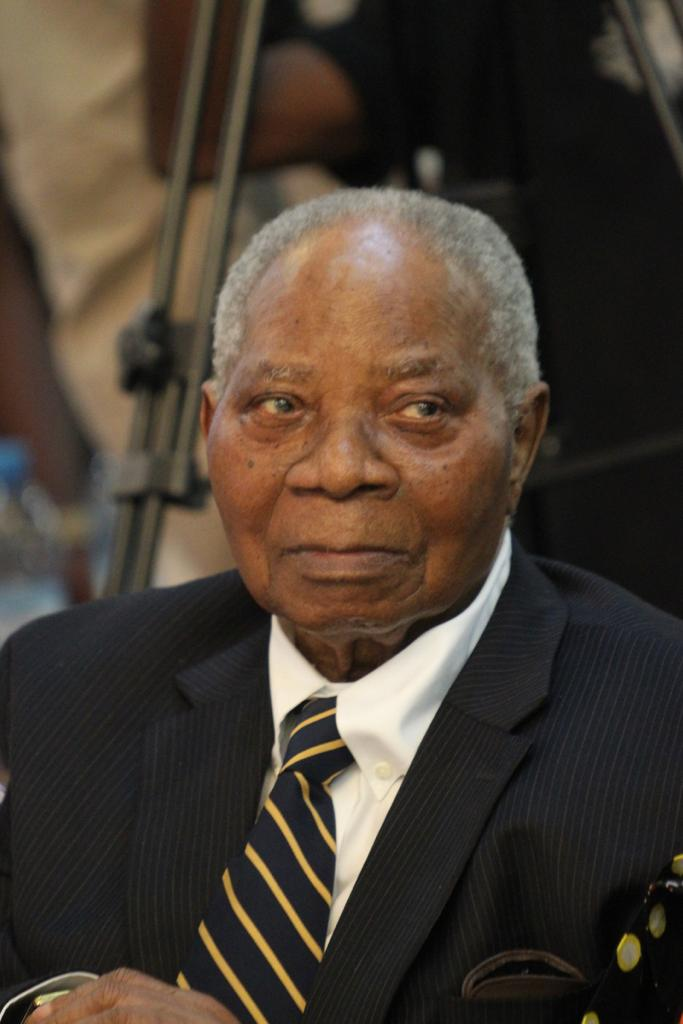
- Born: 16 April 1930; Delta State, Nigeria
- Died: 26 July 2022 (aged 92)
- Education: The University of Ibadan,
- Occupation: Diplomat
- Known for: Permanent Representative of Nigeria to United Nations

Blessing Akporode Clark, CON (16 April 1930 – 26 July 2022) was a Nigerian diplomat. He was ambassador to Ethiopia, Switzerland, and Permanent Representative to the Organisation of African Unity and the United Nations in Geneva and New York He was the Presidential Advisory Council member on foreign affairs from 1999 to 2015. Clark was a life member of the Institute of International Affairs and Ikoyi club. He died on 26 July 2022, at the age of 92.

== Education and career ==
Blessing started his education at Government College Ughelli in Delta State. He later attended University college Ibadan around 1952. He's a contemporary of the late Gamaliel Onosode. After his university days, he joined the Old Western Region Public Service as an Assistant Secretary in 1957 where he served in several capacities before joining the Foreign Service in 1961.

As a career diplomat, he played a key role in building and sustaining a good relationship between Nigeria and multilateral institutions. He rose to the position of Permanent Secretary, Ministry of Foreign Affairs, Permanent Representative of Nigeria to United Nations in New York, Geneva, and Organization of African Unity.

At UN, he headed the committee in charge of the Special Committee against Apartheid. Then was also and Chairman, Committee on Peace Keeping In 1981, he was reassigned to Nigeria as Director-General, Foreign Ministry in charge of service matters. He retired from service in 1984. After he retired from active service, he was appointed to the Presidential Advisory Council on Foreign Affairs from 1999 to 2015. He has been serving as an active trustees and member of the council of Retired Federal Permanent Secretaries (CORFEPS) and the Association of Retired Career Ambassador of Nigeria (ARCAN). In 1999 he was conferred with the National Honor of Commander of the Order of the Niger (CON).
